The discography of the American rock band the Cars includes seven studio albums, eight compilation albums, four video albums and 26 singles. Originating in Boston in 1976, the band consisted of singer/guitarist Ric Ocasek, singer/bassist Benjamin Orr, guitarist Elliot Easton, keyboardist Greg Hawkes, and drummer David Robinson. The Cars sold over 23 million albums in the United States and had 13 singles that reached the Top 40. The band was inducted into the Rock and Roll Hall of Fame in 2018.

Albums

Studio albums

Compilation albums

Box sets

Singles

Videos

Video albums

Music videos

Notes

References

External links
Unofficial discography of The Cars

Discographies of American artists
Rock music group discographies
New wave discographies
Discography